Two Steps from Hell is an American production music company based in Los Angeles, California. It was founded in 2006 by Thomas Bergersen and Nick Phoenix, a pair of composers born in Norway and England respectively. The two friends created the company to make trailer music demos to be circulated exclusively within the movie advertising industry for the purpose of licensing; they are partnered with Extreme Music who handle licensing arrangements. The duo are among the most successful in their field, having supplied background tracks for thousands of film trailers and TV commercials. They compose separately but release their creations together. Typically, their music is orchestral and choral based, but with modern complements and structured similar to pop songs. The stentorian nature of their works has led the frequent use of a contemporary label, "epic music", to define their style.

They established themselves as a major player in the market of the late 2000s, providing tracks to trailers for major film franchises such as Harry Potter, Pirates of the Caribbean, Star Trek and Twilight. As the public became exposed to their music, the pair gained a cult following online who pleaded for their compositions to be made available to purchase; Two Steps from Hell soon released their first two public albums, Invincible (2010) and Archangel (2011), collections of their most popular demo music to date. These were followed by the album SkyWorld (2012), this time consisting entirely of brand new music straight to commercial release. With these albums all successful, the duo organized their first concert, at Walt Disney Concert Hall, in 2013.

A waning demand for traditional trailer music in the movie industry emerged by the mid-2010s; the pair have since focused increasingly on creating further public albums comprising new and more varied compositions, with far less of an emphasis on composing demos for trailers, whilst continuing to release more of their back catalog commercially as well. Such music has performed increasingly well in the United States; 13 of their releases have reached the top ten of the Billboard Classical Crossover Albums charts, three of which have peaked at number one: Battlecry (2015), Unleashed (2017), and Myth (2022), the first also charting on the Billboard 200. The 2020s began with the group consolidating their popularity by organizing their first tour, in Europe.

History
Two Steps from Hell was founded in early 2006 when Thomas Bergersen and Nick Phoenix joined forces to write original music for movie trailers. The two have composed music for over 1,000 major motion picture trailers.

With the founding of the company in 2006, Bergersen was looking for a name that would draw attention with the old adage in mind, "All PR is good PR." The idea for the name came from "Two Steps From Heaven", a Norwegian nightclub that, according to Bergersen, had a similar theme going on.

Despite the company finding success with its music, the tracks were not officially released to the public until the May 2010 release of the commercial album Invincible. Invincible was approaching Gold record status. As of January 2017, Two Steps from Hell has published 10 public albums in addition to 20 demonstration albums, with almost 1,000 unique tracks in total.

Invincible was followed by Bergersen's first solo album, Illusions, then Archangel and Halloween, both primarily compilation albums of industry tracks. Next, SkyWorld was released as the first public album to feature mostly new tracks, followed by the primarily compilation albums Classics Volume One and Miracles.

In 2013 Nick Phoenix released his only solo album to date, Speed of Sound.

The album Sun, which was released on September 30, 2014, is the second solo album from Thomas Bergersen. Preview tracks were released from the album, titled "Cry" and "Sun", the former of which can be downloaded from Bergersen's official website. An official music video for "Sun" was also released on YouTube, preceding the announcement of a signed limited deluxe edition CD release set to include additional tracks and notes from Thomas, as well as a large-size poster featuring his artwork.

Additionally, in July 2014 Two Steps from Hell released an e-book known as Colin Frake on Fire Mountain, which features a 75,000-word novel written by Nick Phoenix with illustrations by Otto Bjornik, as well as an original score also made available via a soundtrack release. A sequel entitled Colin Frake: Asclepius was released in April 2017.

2015 saw the release of Battlecry featuring all new songs. This album proved to be a huge success for the company, charting at position 183 on the US Billboard 200. This was followed by the compilation album Classics Volume Two in 2015, and the all new albums Vanquish, Unleashed, and Dragon in 2016, 2017, and 2019 respectively.

In 2020 Bergersen released the first two chapters (out of seven) of his Humanity album. These featured mostly new tracks, with several reworked tracks from older releases.

Two Steps from Hell's main graphic artist is Steven Gilmore, who has created album covers for almost every promotional and public release, including the logo of the company, with the only exception being the 2009 DVD release of their library, for which the album cover was created by Paul Zeaiter. Additionally, Thomas Bergersen's Illusions solo album features design by Jesper Krijgsman, while its sequel, Sun, features artwork created by Thomas himself.

Their success has also been reflected in platforms such as YouTube, where they have millions of subscribers  and over a hundred million views on popular soundtracks such as "Victory".

Main appearances

The company's music has been featured in:

 Trailers for, but not limited to: Harry Potter and the Order of the Phoenix, Harry Potter and the Deathly Hallows – Part 1, Harry Potter and the Deathly Hallows – Part 2, Star Trek, Star Trek Into Darkness, The Dark Knight, The Fighter, Rise of the Planet of the Apes, Tron: Legacy, Anna Karenina, No Country for Old Men, 2012, Captain America: The First Avenger, The Avengers, X-Men: First Class, X-Men: Days of Future Past, Pirates of the Caribbean: At World's End, Super 8, Inception, World War Z, Inkheart, The Chronicles of Narnia: The Voyage of the Dawn Treader, Lincoln, WALL-E, Up, The Twilight Saga: Eclipse, Hugo, The Town, Priest, Prince of Persia: The Sands of Time, Interstellar, The Man Who Knew Infinity, Neon Genesis Evangelion, Batman v Superman: Dawn of Justice, and Aquaman.
 Video games such as Might & Magic Heroes VII (Entrance cinematic), Resident Evil 6, Mass Effect 2, Mass Effect 3 (Taking Back Earth trailer, Black Blade, After the Fall), PlanetSide 2, Killzone 3, Star Wars: The Old Republic, Elder Scrolls Online, League of Legends (E-sports tournaments; Various Pieces from the Burn album), The Witcher 3 (A Night to Remember Trailer; A Hole in the Sun), F1 2013, Assassin's Creed IV: Black Flag and Uncharted 4.
 Television series such as Breaking Bad, Doctor Who, Game of Thrones, Sherlock, I'm a Celebrity...Get Me Out of Here!, Revolution, Homeland, The Walking Dead, Supernatural, Merlin, Trollhunters: Tales of Arcadia, Amphibia, Deadliest Warrior, Nathan for You, The World Wars, Wild Planet: North America and during the 2012 London Olympics. The track "Archangel", from the album of the same name, was also used in an episode of Britain's Got Talent. The track "Nero" was also used in the Top Gear special: "The Perfect Road Trip", in the series "Heart of Courage" was used in season 17, episode 3 and in season 18, episode 4, and “Black Blade” was used in season 19, episode 2, and season 21, episode 4.

Concerts
Two Steps from Hell hosted a live concert on June 14, 2013, at the Disney Hall, in Los Angeles, California, performing some of their most popular songs, such as "Heart of Courage," "Protectors of the Earth," "To Glory," "Strength of a Thousand Men," "Black Blade," and "Breathe," as well as "Ocean Princess," '"Age of Gods," and "Remember Me" from Bergersen's album Illusions.

The second live concert happened on April 20, 2018, and was organized by the Film Music Prague Festival. The concert was performed by Praga Sinfonietta, which was conducted by Petr Pololáník, Kühns mixed choir, Merethe Soltvedt and Kamila Nývltová as solo singers. Thomas Bergersen participated on several songs playing on violin or piano. Performed were these songs: "Strength of a Thousand Men", "Fill My Heart", "Protectors of Earth", "Everlasting", "Heart of Courage", "Fire Nation", "Ocean Princess", "Master of Shadows", "Flight of the Silverbird", "Blackout", "Winterspell", "Stormkeeper", "Evergreen", "Neverdark", "Victory", "Fall of the Fountain World", "To Glory", and as an encore "Remember Me".

2020 was supposed to see the start of the Two Steps From Hell European tour, but this was postponed due to the COVID-19 pandemic.

On June 15, 2022 Two Steps From Hell started their European tour in Brussels and visited other European cities. The concert was performed by Odessa Opera Orchestra assisted by ReChoir, a professional Polish choir. Thomas Bergersen and Nick Phoenix participated on several songs.

Discography

Commercial albums

Studio albums 
The group's paramount publicly released music:

Solo albums 
Albums created by only one composer; "part of the Two Steps catalog", but released under the individual composer's name:

Anthology series 
A series of previously private demo albums released for public purchase; modified to consist of just their residual tracks not yet available on other public studio albums:

Soundtracks 
Albums featuring the group as the composers of another media's soundtrack:

Live albums 
Albums consisting of tracks recorded live:

Japan-exclusive albums 
Albums compiled for release only in Japan:

Mobile-exclusive albums 
Miscellaneous albums only available on mobile devices:

Demonstration albums

Main catalog 
The group's demo albums released exclusively to clients in the motion picture and advertising industry for the purpose of licensing. Much of the music originating from these demos has since been made available for public purchase on the commercial albums listed above.

Third-party albums 
A handful of albums have been released under the Two Steps from Hell name which are creations entirely by third-party composers; consequently, they are not considered part of the group's primary catalog:

Singles

Commercial singles 
 
Singles available for public purchase that are not on any public album or were initially released as pre-release tracks. All of the following pieces are written by Bergersen, except where noted:

Non-commercial singles 
Songs that are not on any public album or were initially made available for public listening via the group's official social media channels, but not available for public purchase at the time of publishing. All of the following pieces are written by Bergersen, except when noted:

Other media

E-books 
Two Steps from Hell have expanded their catalog of creations beyond music by also releasing a series of e-books, each written by Phoenix. All are part of a planned pentalogy of sci-fi fantasy novels called Colin Frake. The series follows the adventures of the adolescent protagonist of the same name, set in the fictional world of "Reanne". Each book is accompanied by an orchestral soundtrack created by the group, and a collection of hand-drawn illustrations by artist Otto Björnik.

Mobile app 
On 5 June 2012, Two Steps from Hell announced they would soon be launching an official mobile app for iOS and Android devices. The app was subsequently released three weeks later. Downloading the app gave users access to "news, promotions... videos, photos and albums", but most notably, 19 tracks of previously private demo music available in a new limited-time digital album called Demon's Dance. Gergely Vilaghy of Trailer Music News concluded that the app's creation was not revolutionary but that "it was unseen in the trailer music scene before". It has since been discontinued.

Notes

References

External links 

 
 
 

Two Steps from Hell
American companies established in 2006
Companies based in Los Angeles
Music production companies